Bigelowia nuttallii (Nuttall's rayless goldenrod) is a species of North American flowering plants in the family Asteraceae, native to the southern United States (Texas, Louisiana, Alabama, Georgia, and Florida).

Bigelowia nuttallii is a sub-shrub up to 70 cm (28 inches) tall, often forming clumps. Most of the leaves are in a rosette near the ground, with smaller and narrower leaves on the stems. Flower heads are small, yellow, and displayed in flat-topped arrays, each with 2-6 disc florets but no ray florets. The plants generally grow in sandy soil.

References

External links
Lady Bird Johnson Wildflower Center, University of Texas
Discover Life
Mt. Cuba Center, Hockessin, Delaware, Bigelowia nuttallii, Nuttall's rayless-goldenrod
Native Florida Wildflowers
Alabama Plant Atlas

Astereae
Flora of the Southern United States
Plants described in 1970